María José Caro (born Lima, 1985) is a Peruvian writer.

Life
Caro was born in Lima in 1985. She has a master's degree from the Universidad Complutense de Madrid. She has published three books, including two short story collections - ¿Qué tengo de malo? (2017), La primaria (2012) - and a novel Perro de negros (2016). In 2017, she was named as one of the Bogota39, a list of the best young writers in Latin America. The other 38 included Samanta Schweblin, the Brazilian Gabriela Jauregui, Liliana Colanzi from Bolivia and Lola Copacabana.

References

1985 births
Living people
Peruvian writers
Peruvian women writers
Complutense University of Madrid alumni
Peruvian short story writers
Peruvian novelists